A Touch of Class is a big band jazz album recorded by the Thad Jones/Mel Lewis Jazz Orchestra in Warsaw, Poland in November 1978.  The first three tracks, together with a 14-minute version of "Fingers," were previously released in Poland on a Poljazz LP and all tracks were also included on the 2007 compilation album, Thad Jones Mel Lewis Orchestra In Europe and on the 2009 compilation CD, The Complete Poland Concerts 1976 & 1978.

Track listing
 "Quietude" (Thad Jones) – 7:26
 "Samba Con Get Chu" (Bob Brookmeyer) – 13:35
 "Cecilia Is Love" (Frank Foster) – 7:06
 "I Love You" (Cole Porter) – 5:57
 "And I Love You So" (Don McLean) – 7:33
 "That's Freedom" (Jones) – 9:14

Personnel
 Thad Jones – flugelhorn
 Mel Lewis – drums
 Jim McNeely – piano
 Jesper Lundgaard – bass
 Dick Oatts – alto saxophone
 Steve Coleman – alto saxophone
 Rich Perry – tenor saxophone
 Robert Rockwell – tenor saxophone
 Charles Davis – baritone saxophone
 Ron Tooley – trumpet
 Simo Salminen – trumpet
 Irvin Stokes – trumpet
 Larry Moss – trumpet
 Doug Purviance – trombone
 Lolly Bienenfeld – trombone
 Lu Robertson – trombone
 John Mosca – trombone

References / External Links

 West Wind Jazz WW2402
 Poljazz ZSX 697
 Allmusic [ link]

1978 live albums
The Thad Jones/Mel Lewis Orchestra live albums
West Wind Records live albums